Ronny is a 1931 German musical comedy film directed by Reinhold Schünzel and starring Käthe von Nagy, Willy Fritsch, and Hans Wassmann. A separate French-language version Ronny was also released. It was shot at the Babelsberg Studios in Berlin and premiered at the city's Gloria-Palast. The film's art direction was by Werner Schlichting and Benno von Arent.

Cast

References

Bibliography

External links 
 

1931 musical comedy films
German musical comedy films
1931 films
Films of the Weimar Republic
1930s German-language films
Films directed by Reinhold Schünzel
German multilingual films
UFA GmbH films
German black-and-white films
1931 multilingual films
1930s German films
Films shot at Babelsberg Studios